Morning View is an unincorporated community in Kenton County, Kentucky, United States. Morning View has a post office with ZIP code 41063.

References

Unincorporated communities in Kenton County, Kentucky
Unincorporated communities in Kentucky